Youssoufia Province is a province of Morocco in the Marrakesh-Safi Region. The province had a population of 251,943 people in 2014.

Administrative divisions

Clubs Sports Province
Club Olympique Hmar de Echemaia
Mouloudia Club Lakouablia de Lakouablia Msabih Talaa
Olympic Club Youssoufia

References

 
Youssoufia Province